The 2020 United States Senate election in Oklahoma was held on November 3, 2020, to elect a member of the United States Senate to represent the State of Oklahoma, concurrently with the 2020 U.S. presidential election, as well as other elections to the United States Senate in other states and elections to the United States House of Representatives and various state and local elections. Incumbent Republican Senator Jim Inhofe won reelection to a fifth full term, defeating Democratic challenger Abby Broyles.

This proved to be the fifth U.S. Senate election in Oklahoma in a row in which the Democratic nominee failed to carry any of Oklahoma's counties, but Broyles came very close to breaking this drought, losing Oklahoma County by less than one percentage point.

Republican primary

Candidates

Nominee
 Jim Inhofe, incumbent U.S. Senator

Eliminated in primary
 J.J. Stitt, farmer and gun shop owner
 John Tompkins, orthopedic surgeon

Declined
 Scott Pruitt, former Administrator of the Environmental Protection Agency, former Attorney General of Oklahoma, and former state senator

Endorsements

Results

Democratic primary

Candidates

Nominee
 Abby Broyles, attorney and former KFOR news reporter

Eliminated in primary
 Sheila Bilyeu, perennial candidate
 R. O. Joe Cassity, Jr., lawyer and retired college professor

Withdrawn
 Dylan Billings, political science professor
 Tyler Dougherty, software developer
 Bevon Rogers, former oil and gas industrialist (ran for state senate)
 Paul Tay, perennial candidate (ran for Mayor of Tulsa)
 Perry Williams
 Mike Workman, political consultant, nominee for U.S. Senate in 2016, and nominee for Oklahoma Labor Commissioner in 2014

Declined
 Brad Henry, former Governor of Oklahoma

Endorsements

Results

Other candidates

Libertarian Party

Nominee
 Robert Murphy, nominee for U.S. Senate in 2016

Independents

Declared 
 Joan Farr, 2014 candidate
 A. D. Nesbit

General election

Predictions

Endorsements

Polling

Graphical summary

with generic Democrat

Results

Notes
Partisan clients

Voter samples and additional candidates

References

External links
 
 
  (State affiliate of the U.S. League of Women Voters)
 

Official campaign websites
 Abby Broyles (D) for Senate
 Joan Farr (I) for Senate
 Jim Inhofe (R) for Senate
 Robert Murphy (L) for Senate

2020
Oklahoma
United States Senate